Roosenburg is a Dutch surname. Notable people with the surname include:

André Roosenburg (1923–2002), Dutch footballer
Dirk Roosenburg (1887–1962), Dutch architect and designer
Henriette Roosenburg (1916–1972), Dutch journalist

Dutch-language surnames